The Galt Arena Gardens is one of the oldest continuously-operating ice hockey arenas in the world and the oldest operating arena in Ontario. Galt Arena Gardens  was built throughout 1921 and opened in January 1922. It was located in the city of Galt, which is now a part of the city of Cambridge, Ontario. It is the home of the junior hockey team, Cambridge Redhawks as well as the Special Hockey International team, Cambridge Ice Hounds. The arena is noted for its impressive external facade. Hockey legend Gordie Howe played in the arena for the Galt Red Wings during the 1944-1945 season before playing in the National Hockey League.
Former New York Americans centreman Norman Himes grew up right across the street from the arena at 91 Shade Street. He played OHA senior hockey in the arena for the Galt Terriers. Ontario Hockey Association teams including the Galt Rockets and Galt Black Hawks also played at the building.

Several ice hockey arenas are older, including the Aberdeen Pavilion in Ottawa, built in 1898, and the Stannus Street Rink, of Windsor, Nova Scotia, built in 1897, but are no longer in operation for ice hockey. The 1910 Matthews Arena in Boston is still in operation, but it closed for several seasons due to fires and for renovations.

The arena was most recently renovated in 1997, replacing the concrete floor, the spectator seating and the dressing rooms. The renovation reduced seating capacity from 2,000 to 1,100.

References

Notes

External links
 Galt Arena Gardens - OHL Arena Guide

Buildings and structures in Cambridge, Ontario
Indoor arenas in Ontario
Indoor ice hockey venues in Canada
Ontario Hockey League arenas
Sports venues in the Regional Municipality of Waterloo
Sport in Cambridge, Ontario
Sports venues completed in 1922
1922 establishments in Ontario